Frederick Warne & Co. is a British publisher founded in 1865. It is known for children's books, particularly those of Beatrix Potter, and for its Observer's Books.

Warne is an imprint of Penguin Random House, a subsidiary of German media conglomerate Bertelsmann.

History 

Frederick Warne & Co. was founded in July 1865 by London bookseller and publisher, Frederick Warne. The business was one successor to Routledge, Warne, Routledge (thus from 1858), the publishing partnership of Warne with his brother-in-law George Routledge and the eldest of Routledge's sons. The other successor was George Routledge & Sons.

During the second half of the nineteenth century, the company built a reputation for publishing children's books, publishing illustrated books by well-known authors and artists as Edward Lear, Kate Greenaway and Walter Crane. The company also published a 'Pictorial' series of books of collections of short essays and illustrations on many non-fiction topics. The following list may not be complete.

Pictorial Cabinet of Marvels
Pictorial Chronicles of the Mighty Deep
Pictorial Museum of Sport and Adventure
Pictorial Records of Remarkable Events
Pictorial Stories of Heroism and Enterprise
Pictorial Travels on Land and Sea
Pictorial Treasury of Famous Men and Famous Deeds
The Pictorial Tour of the World

Toward the end of the century, Frederick Warne had retired and left the firm to his three sons, Harold, Fruing and Norman. Warne was among the six publishers whom Beatrix Potter submitted her first book, the story of a rabbit called Peter. Like the other five firms, Warne turned the proposal down. But the people at the firm changed their minds when they saw the privately published copy in 1901. They said they would publish the book, as long as the illustrations were drawn in colour. The next year, Warne published The Tale of Peter Rabbit, and by Christmas it had sold 20,000 copies. This began a 40-year partnership that saw the publication of 22 additional little books. Beatrix Potter was engaged to marry Norman Warne, her editor and the youngest of the three Warne brothers. However, he died tragically in 1905, only a few weeks after their engagement. Harold, the eldest brother, took over as Potter's editor. She continued to produce one or two new Little Books each year for the next eight years until her marriage in 1913 to William Heelis. During the next few years, Potter turned her attention to her farm work, but when the company fell on hard times and Harold was imprisoned for embezzlement, she came to the rescue with another new title to support "the old firm." Potter, who had no children, left the rights to her works to Warne upon her death. The company continued to publish them; it also brought out several biographical works about its most renowned author. Over the years, Warne also expanded its nonfiction publishing, issuing among others the Observer's Books.

In 1983, Warne was bought by Penguin Books. It began developing classic book-based children's character brands. The merchandising program was expanded from a base of thirty-five licenses to more than four hundred by the late 1990s. Over the years, Warne acquired a variety of other classic books.

A major motion picture about the life of Beatrix Potter Miss Potter, starring Renée Zellweger as Beatrix Potter and Ewan McGregor as Norman Warne was released in 2006. While the company no longer exists as an independent company, it continues to exist as an imprint of Penguin Group. The company collaborated with Sony Pictures Animation and Animal Logic to produce the Peter Rabbit film, which was released in 2018.

Beatrix Potter books 

From 1902 to 1930 Warne published twenty-three story books written and illustrated for children by Beatrix Potter. Primarily they feature anthropomorphic animals, such as Peter Rabbit in the first of the series, The Tale of Peter Rabbit. Here they are listed by year of the first edition.

 The Tale of Peter Rabbit (1902)
 The Tale of Squirrel Nutkin (1903)
 The Tailor of Gloucester (1903)
 The Tale of Benjamin Bunny (1904)
 The Tale of Two Bad Mice (1904)
 The Tale of Mrs. Tiggy-Winkle (1905)
 The Tale of the Pie and the Patty-Pan (1905)
 The Tale of Mr. Jeremy Fisher (1906)
 The Story of A Fierce Bad Rabbit (1906)
 The Story of Miss Moppet (1906)
 The Tale of Tom Kitten (1907)
 The Tale of Jemima Puddle-Duck (1908)
 The Tale of Samuel Whiskers or, The Roly-Poly Pudding (1908)
 The Tale of the Flopsy Bunnies (1909)
 The Tale of Ginger and Pickles (1909)
 The Tale of Mrs. Tittlemouse (1910)
 The Tale of Timmy Tiptoes (1911)
 The Tale of Mr. Tod (1912)
 The Tale of Pigling Bland (1913)
 Appley Dapply's Nursery Rhymes (1917)
 The Tale of Johnny Town-Mouse (1918)
 Cecily Parsley's Nursery Rhymes (1922)
 The Tale of Little Pig Robinson (1930)

Warne also published the first British edition of one longer children's book written and illustrated by Potter.
 The Fairy Caravan (1952); US edition, 1929

Observer's Books 

From 1937 to 2003, Warne published small, pocket-sized books, which considered many subjects. The aim of these books were to interest the observer known as the Observer's books. These books were intended for children.

For the dedicated collector this could be a lifetime's work as there are over 800 variations, some of which are now very rare. The values of the books can vary from 50p to hundreds of pounds. They all include a variety of topics, which include hobbies, art, history, wildlife and many others.The earlier books were printed with paper dust covers up until 1969. These were good for printing but were not very practical because they were very delicate and were easy to rip and stain. From 1970, the covers were protected with a glossy coating. This helped the dust covers protection. These types are often referred to as Glossies. From the late 1970s, Warne decided to laminate the covers to the actual books, so the books were highly protected as they didn't really have any covers. The dust covers from 1937 to 1970 had designs that were colourful and attractive as each one had its own unique colouring of squiggly lines at the top. In 1971, Warne decided to refurbish its books with a more formal dust jacket. These were good but it lost the charm that the original covers had had. The first Observer guide was published in 1937, and was on the subject of British Birds. This is now very rare, and a mint copy with a dust cover is worth hundreds of pounds. The same year, Warne published a second book, on British Wild Flowers, a mint copy of this book is worth around £220.

By 1941, Warne had published the first six Observer's books. In 1942, a special edition book was brought out on Airplanes. This book had no number in the series, as it was bought out to help people spot enemy planes during World War 2. It was printed again in 1943 and in 1945. When Warne was acquired by Penguin books in 1983, Warne bought out new editions of the Observer's books. These were slightly bigger than the earlier editions and were in paperback, not hardback. The same year Penguin started printing their own, more up to date Observer's books. These again were slightly larger than the originals but were hardbacks. Like the later original Observer's books, The dust cover was laminated to the actual book. There were two types of the penguin Observer's books, Bloomsbury Observer's, and Claremont Observer's, (of which there were only 12 different editions).

References

External links 
 Frederick Warne at Penguin Books
 Frederick Warne Archive, University of Reading Special Collections
 Frederick Warne Archive, University of Bristol Library Special Collections

Book publishing companies of the United Kingdom
Publishing companies established in 1865
1983 mergers and acquisitions
Penguin Random House
Reference publishers